Progressive Reform Party may refer to:
Progressive Reform Party (South Africa)
Progressive Reform Party (Suriname)

See also 
Progressive Party (disambiguation)